The Pot Book: A Complete Guide to Cannabis is a 2010 book about cannabis edited by Julie Holland M.D., a United States psychiatrist specializing in psychopharmacology. Holland has stated that proceeds from the book's sales will be used to fund further research on cannabis. Holland has also stated that humans and cannabis coevolved.

See also
 List of books about cannabis

References

Further reading

2010 non-fiction books
Non-fiction books about cannabis